Here is a list of English Schools Football Association competitions in 2005-2006:

2005-2006 Competitions
Schools